Christopher Sawyer is a Scottish video game designer and programmer. He is best known for creating Transport Tycoon, which has been considered "one of the most important simulation games ever made", and the bestseller RollerCoaster Tycoon series. After a period away from the games industry in the late 2000s, Sawyer founded 31X, a mobile game development company.

Early life
Sawyer was born in Stirling, Scotland, and had an interest with computers and programming from an early age, writing simple scripts in BASIC on a ZX81 at a local store in Doune. Being unable to afford a BBC Micro, Sawyer purchased a Camputers Lynx with which he could write simple programs in machine code. He graduated with a degree in Computer Science and Microprocessor Systems from the University of Strathclyde in Glasgow.

Career

Memotech & MS-DOS titles (1983–1993)
Sawyer began to write games in Z80 machine code on his Memotech MTX home computer- which possessed a built in assembler- and then later on an Amstrad CPC series home computer. He sent tapes containing his games to Memotech, who arranged first publications of his titles. Some of these were published by Ariolasoft, Sepulcri Scelerati and Ziggurat. He faced issues with one company failing to pay him royalties on continued sales of his games. From 1988 to 1993, Sawyer worked on MS-DOS conversions of Amiga games and was involved in many projects, including Virus, Conqueror, Campaign, Birds of Prey, Dino Dini's Goal and Frontier: Elite II. In the case of the latter, Sawyer worked to improve on the Amiga version by adding texture mapping to the title.

Tycoon games (1994–2004)
Inspired by Sid Meier's Railroad Tycoon, Sawyer began to develop his own title which made use of an isometric gameworld system he had been designing as a personal project. His management simulation game Transport Tycoon was released by MicroProse in 1994 and became a classic of the "tycoon" series of games. A year later, he improved and extended the game, giving it the title Transport Tycoon Deluxe. The title sold well, and Sawyer immediately sought to create a sequel.

While working on the basic game engine for this sequel, Sawyer had used some of the revenue from Transport Tycoon to travel across Europe and the United States and developed an interest in roller coasters, having ridden over 600 of them by the 2010s, inspiring what would become RollerCoaster Tycoon. Sawyer developed RollerCoaster Tycoon in x86 assembly language by himself, using only the services of freelance graphic designer Simon Foster and composer Allister Brimble. After creating RollerCoaster Tycoon, he resumed work on the sequel for Transport Tycoon, but again postponed it to create RollerCoaster Tycoon 2. Upon completing that project, he resumed his work on the Transport Tycoon sequel, finally releasing it in 2004 as Chris Sawyer's Locomotion.

Sawyer also served as a consultant for Atari in the development of RollerCoaster Tycoon 3, which was designed by Frontier Developments. Sawyer understood that further development of the franchise would require 3D graphics but was not interested about that and left it to Frontier.

Departure from industry (2005–2010)
In November 2005, Sawyer sued Atari, claiming that they had failed to pay him certain royalties. Atari sued Sawyer for damages in 2007, and the two settled out of court for an undisclosed amount paid to Sawyer in February 2008. Due to a combination of the legal issues with Atari, and a general detest of the violent nature of video games of the time, Sawyer temporarily stepped away from video games after the release of Locomotion. In an interview, Sawyer also cited a desire to take a break after working on games for 20 years, to spend more time on his personal interests.

Formation of 31X Ltd. (2010–present)
In 2010, Sawyer founded 31X Ltd. which he initially planned to use as a holding company for the Transport Tycoon intellectual property. However, he saw that there was interest in a mobile version of Transport Tycoon and a space in the market for simulation games like this, and reworked 31X to be a video game developer focused on mobile games. In addition to Sawyer, several others that worked with him on the Tycoon games became part of 31X, including Jacqui Lyons, who worked with Sawyer for more than 20 years, serving as the company's executive producer.

31X's first product was Transport Tycoon for iOS and Android, released in 2013, which was assisted with Origin8. Sawyer continued to work with Origin8 to bring the first two RollerCoaster Tycoon games into RollerCoaster Tycoon Classic released for mobile in December 2016. The game later received ports to Microsoft Windows and macOS in September 2017.

Works

Notes

References

External links

Interview with Sawyer on Locomotion from GameSpot
Interview with Sawyer from Eurogamer

20th-century births
Living people
1967 births
Alumni of the University of Strathclyde
British computer programmers
British video game designers
British video game programmers
Scottish people